Manithan may refer to:

Manithan (1953 film), a 1953 Tamil film
Manithan (1987 film), a 1987 Tamil film
Manithan (2016 film), a 2016 Tamil film